Stepchild is a 1947 American drama film directed by James Flood and starring Brenda Joyce, Donald Woods and Vivian Austin.

Cast
 Brenda Joyce as Dale Bullock 
 Donald Woods as Ken Bullock 
 Vivian Austin as Millie Lynne 
 Tommy Ivo as Jim Bullock 
 Gregory Marshall as Tommy Bullock 
 Griff Barnett as Burns 
 James Millican as Brian Reed 
 Selmer Jackson as Judge 
 Ruth Robinson as Miss Brighton

References

Bibliography
 Darby, William. Masters of Lens and Light: A Checklist of Major Cinematographers and Their Feature Films. Scarecrow Press, 1991.

External links
 

1947 films
1947 drama films
1940s English-language films
American drama films
Films directed by James Flood
Producers Releasing Corporation films
Eagle-Lion Films films
American black-and-white films
1940s American films